Panevėžys District Municipality is one of 60 municipalities in Lithuania.

References

 
Municipalities of Panevėžys County
Municipalities of Lithuania